Trigonella maritima is a species of plant in the family Fabaceae.

Sources

References 

Flora of Malta
Trifolieae